Marie-Félicité Brosset (24 January 1802 – 3 September 1880) was a French orientalist who specialized in Georgian and Armenian studies. He worked mostly in Russia.

Early life and first works 
Marie-Félicité Brosset was born in Paris into the family of a poor merchant, who died a few months after his birth.  His mother destined him to the Church.  He attended the theological seminaries in Orléans, where he studied Greek, Latin, Hebrew, and Arabic.

Back in Paris, he attended lectures delivered at the Collège de France by Carl Benedict Hase (Greek), Antoine-Isaac Silvestre de Sacy (Arabic), and Jean-Pierre Abel-Rémusat (Chinese).  He was elected to the Asiatic Society in 1825.  His son, Laurent, reported "...after five years of unceasing effort, he suddenly gave up.." and he burned all the material he had created.

From 1826 he devoted himself to the Armenian and Georgian languages, as well as their history and culture. He had finally found his true vocation.  Books, texts, teachers, and documents were all scarce, however.  For his work in Armenian, he was helped by Antoine-Jean Saint-Martin.  For his Georgian work, he had to create his own dictionary from the Georgian translation of the Bible, which was faithful to the Greek text.

Russia 
Invited to Saint Petersburg in 1837 by the president of the Imperial Academy of Sciences, Count Sergey Uvarov, Brosset was elected a member a year later.  He journeyed to the Caucasus in 1847–48.  Brosset translated—and commented on—the major medieval and early-modern Georgian chroniclers.  He published his work in seven volumes from 1849 to 1858. His magnum opus, Histoire de la Géorgie, was a long-standing authority on the history of Georgia. Brosset also published the correspondence between the czars and the kings of Georgia that occurred from 1639 to 1770.

From 1861 to 1868, Brosset focused on his series regarding Armenian historians, but continued to work on them until 1876.  Brosset wrote over 250 works on Georgian and Armenian history and culture overall.

Brosset left Russia in May 1880 and retired to his daughter's residence in Châtellerault. He died there several months later, on 3 September. His son, Laurent, contributed heavily to the knowledge of his life and works.

Works

Lists of works 
 Brosset, Laurent. Bibliographie analytique — 271 titles, not counting supplements. Alphabetical index: p. 585-704
  in Bulletin de l'Académie impériale des sciences de Saint-Pétersbourg. Vol. 27, 1880, p. 1 — 237 titles

Selected works 
 (1837) . Paris: Imprimerie royale — Reprint: Osnabrück: Biblio, 1974, LVI, 366 p. 
 (1848–58) , 7 volumes, Saint Petersburg, 694 p.
 , 1858
 Histoire de la Géorgie depuis l'Antiquité jusqu'au XIXe siècle, Introduction, CCXIV p., and Tables of contents, XCVI p., Saint Petersburg: Académie impériale des sciences, 1858.
 , 1849
 , Partie 2: Histoire moderne. Livraison 2, 1857
 , Saint Petersburg: Académie impériale des sciences, 1851, 494 p.
 (1851) , Saint Petersburg: Académie impériale des sciences, 64 p. 
 (1860–61) Les ruines d’Ani, capitale de l'Arménie sous les rois bagratides aux Xe et XIe siècles, 2 volumes, Saint Petersburg .
 (1862)  in Mémoires de l'Académie Impériale des Sciences de Saint-Pétersbourg, vol. 4, issue 9, 30 p. 
 Collection d'historiens arméniens: dix ouvrages sur l'histoire de l'Arménie et des pays adjacents du Xe au  XIXe siècle, reprinted by APA-Philo Press, 1978 .

Notes and references

Bibliography
 Bouatchidzé, Gaston. La Vie de Marie Brosset, Nantes: Éditions du Petit Véhicule, 1996, 195 p.  
  (Written by his son Laurent Brosset; includes a biography) 
 Khintibidze, Elguja. Georgian literature in European scholarship 
 Rapp, Stephen H. Studies in medieval Georgian historiography: early texts and Eurasian contexts, Peeters Publishers, 2003, 522 p.  
 Шилов, Л. А. Броссе Марий Иванович – Detailed biography, Russian National Library .

Writers from Paris
1802 births
1880 deaths
19th-century French historians
French orientalists
Kartvelian studies scholars
Armenian studies scholars
Full members of the Saint Petersburg Academy of Sciences
Translators from Armenian
Translators from Georgian
Translators to French
Historians of Georgia (country)
Explorers of the Caucasus
Members of the Société Asiatique
19th-century French writers
19th-century translators